Gagik Harutyunyan (born 8 March 1985), better known as Gago Drago, is an Armenian-born Dutch welterweight kickboxer from Alkmaar. He is known for his punch combinations and unpredictable kicking techniques and highly aggressive fighting style. Gago competed in K1-MAX and is trained at Loeks Gym, by Edwin van Os.

Biography and career

Gago Drago was born in Verishen, Armenia on 8 March 1985. In 1989, due to the First Nagorno-Karabakh War, he moved, together with his family, to the Netherlands. At the age of 14 he started training kickboxing at Gym Alkmaar. First as a sparring partner of well-known fighters like Sahin Yakut and Dennis "Rus" Sharoykin. By the age of 20, his name Gagik Haroetjunjan, was replaced by "Gago Drago", when he was fighting his way up in the Dutch and Belgian kickboxing circuit. Early in his career he was not allowed to travel out of the Benelux because of his visa issues. Finally in 2005 he received his Dutch citizenship and was free to fight anywhere in the world.

Drago is loved by fans of his very aggressive style, always moving forward and pressuring his opponents. From 2002 to February 2006 he went four years unbeaten. This winning streak was stopped against Faldir Chahbari during a WFCA-event in Holland on 5 February 2006.

On 5 April 2006 Gago made his debut at the K-1 World MAX 2006 World Tournament Open. In the final eliminations he fought against Danish Ole Laursen. After a nervous start Drago gave his opponent a standing 8-count in the second round and took the three round unanimous decision, placing himself among the top 8 fighters in the K-1 MAX division.

On 13 May 2006 he fought a Superfight against Ray Staring at the K-1 World Grand Prix 2006 in Amsterdam. He lost the fight on points.

Almost two months later on the 30 June 2006 Drago fought on his first K-1 World MAX Finals. In the first round he landed a knee on 2002 K-1 World MAX Champion Albert Kraus to score a knockdown and give him an eight-count. The outcome was a point-victory for Drago who advanced to the semi-finals against Buakaw Por. Pramuk. Gago got knocked down in the second round and lost by unanimous decision, ending the night for the young debutant. His opponent Buakaw Por. Pramuk went on to win the World MAX Title.

Drago fought against Naoki Samukawa at the K-1 World MAX 2006 Champions' Challenge in Tokyo, Japan on 4 September 2006. He won the fight by unanimous decision.

On 3 October 2007 at the K-1 World MAX 2007 World Championship Final, Gago Drago fought the 2005 K-1 World Max Champion Andy Souwer in the tournament quarter finals and was defeated by right hook KO.

Drago later entered the 2010 Enfusion Kickboxing Tournament. Drago made his way to the finals, where he fought highly regarded Muay Thai fighter Pajonsuk. Drago won the bout by unanimous decision, handing the Thai his first loss in over two years and becoming the 2010 Enfusion Kickboxing Tournament Champion.

At the K-1 World MAX 2010 World Championship Tournament Final, Drago defeated rising star Mohammed Khamal in the quarter finals, but lost to Yoshihiro Sato by decision in a competitive bout in the semi finals. Drago stayed behind however to support his friend, Giorgio Petrosyan, who defeated Sato in the finals.

Drago faced Batu Khasikov at Battle of Moscow 8 in Moscow on 3 November 2012 and lost via knockout in round one.

He faced Omar Amrani at Mix Fight Gala XV in Darmstadt, Germany on 26 April 2014. Drago won via TKO in round two.

Titles
2010 Enfusion Kickboxing Tournament Champion -70 kg
K-1 World MAX 2010 Semifinalist
K-1 World MAX 2006 Semifinalist
2004 WMTC European Muay Thai Champion (1 title defense)
2002 Benelux Muay Thai Champion

Kickboxing record

|-
|-  bgcolor="#CCFFCC"
| 2014-04-26 ||Win ||align=left| Omar Amrani || Mix Fight Gala XV || Darmstadt, Germany || TKO || 2 || 1:53
|-
|-  bgcolor="#FFBBBB"
| 2012-11-03 ||Loss ||align=left| Batu Khasikov || Battle of Moscow 8 || Moscow, Russia || KO (right cross) ||1 ||
|-
|-  bgcolor="#CCFFCC"
| 2012-09-08 || Win ||align=left| Baker Barakat || Merseburger Fight Night || Merseburg, Germany || Ext. R. Decision || 4 || 3:00
|-
|-  bgcolor="#FFBBBB"
| 2012-05-27 || Loss ||align=left| Andy Ristie || K-1 World MAX 2012 World Championship Tournament Final 16 || Madrid, Spain || Decision (Unanimous) || 3 || 3:00
|-  bgcolor="#FFBBBB"
| 2012-02-05 || Loss ||align=left| Yuri Bessmertny || Thai Boxe Mania || Turin, Italy || KO (right high kick) || ||
|-  bgcolor="#FFBBBB"
| 2011-11-06 || Loss ||align=left| Bovy Sor Udomson || Shoot the Shooto 2011 || Tokyo, Japan || Decision (Unanimous) || 3 || 3:00
|-
|-  bgcolor="#FFBBBB"
| 2011-09-24 || Loss ||align=left| Artur Kyshenko || BFN Group & Music Hall presents: It's Showtime "Fast & Furious 70MAX", Quarter Finals || Brussels, Belgium || TKO (Referee stoppage) || 3 || 1:03
|-
|-  bgcolor="#FFBBBB"
| 2011-06-18 || Loss ||align=left| Abraham Roqueñi || It's Showtime Madrid 2011 || Madrid, Spain || Decision (Split) || 3 || 3:00
|-
|-  bgcolor="#FFBBBB"
| 2011-03-06 || Loss ||align=left| Artur Kyshenko || It's Showtime Sporthallen Zuid || Amsterdam, Netherlands || Decision (5-0) || 3 ||3:00
|-
|- bgcolor="#FFBBBB"
| 2010-12-11 || Loss ||align=left| Yavuz Kayabasi || Yiannis Evgenikos presents: It’s Showtime Athens || Athens, Greece || Decision (4-1) || 3 || 3:00
|-
|-  bgcolor="#FFBBBB"
| 2010-11-08 || Loss ||align=left| Yoshihiro Sato || K-1 World MAX 2010 Final, Semi Finals || Tokyo, Japan || Decision (Unanimous) || 3 || 3:00
|-
|-  bgcolor="#CCFFCC"
| 2010-11-08 || Win ||align=left| Mohammed Khamal || K-1 World MAX 2010 Final, Quarter Finals || Tokyo, Japan || Decision (Unanimous) || 3 || 3:00
|-
|-  bgcolor="#CCFFCC"
| 2010-10-03 || Win ||align=left| Su Hwan Lee || |K-1 World MAX 2010 Final 16 - Part 2 || Seoul, South Korea || KO (Right High Kick) || 2 || 2:52
|-
! style=background:white colspan=9 |
|-
|-  bgcolor="#FFBBBB"
| 2010-09-12 || Loss ||align=left| Mohammed Medhar || Fightingstars presents: It's Showtime 2010 || Amsterdam, Netherlands || Decision (4-1) || 3 || 3:00
|-  bgcolor="#CCFFCC"
| 2010-07-10 || Win ||align=left| Pajonsuk || Enfusion Kickboxing Tournament '10, Final || Lisbon, Portugal || Decision || 3 || 3:00
|-
! style=background:white colspan=9 |
|-
|-  bgcolor="#CCFFCC"
| 2010-07-10 || Win ||align=left| Rick Barnhill || Enfusion Kickboxing Tournament '10, Semi Finals || Lisbon, Portugal || KO || 2 ||
|-
|-  bgcolor="#FFBBBB"
| 2010-05-29 || Loss ||align=left| Leroy Kaestner || It's Showtime 2010 Amsterdam || Amsterdam, Netherlands || Decision (4-1) || 3 || 3:00
|-  bgcolor="#FFBBBB"
| 2010-03-06 || Loss ||align=left| José Reis || Gala Internacional de Kickboxing || Alenquer, Portugal || Decision || 5 || 3:00
|-
! style=background:white colspan=9 |
|-
|-  bgcolor="#CCFFCC"
| 2010-02-13 ||Win||align=left| Yutaro Yamauchi || It's Showtime 2010 Prague || Prague, Czech Republic || Decision (Unanimous)||3|| 3:00
|-  bgcolor="#CCFFCC"
| 2010-01-? || Win ||align=left| Pasi Luukkanen || Enfusion Kickboxing Tournament '10, 2nd Round || Koh Samui, Thailand || Decision || 3 || 3:00
|-
! style=background:white colspan=9 |
|-
|-  bgcolor="#CCFFCC"
| 2010-01-? || Win ||align=left| Bruno de Carvalho || Enfusion Kickboxing Tournament '10, 1st Round || Koh Samui, Thailand || Decision || 3 || 3:00
|-
|-  bgcolor="#FFBBBB"
| 2009-11-20 || Loss ||align=left| Marcus Öberg || K-1 Rumble of the Kings 2009 in Stockholm || Stockholm, Sweden || Decision (Unanimous) || 3 || 3:00
|-  bgcolor="#CCFFCC"
| 2009-10-26 ||Win ||align=left| Taishin Kohiruimaki || K-1 World MAX 2009 Final, Super Fight || Yokohama, Japan ||Decision (Unanimous) || 3 || 3:00
|-  bgcolor="#CCFFCC"
| 2009-08-29 || Win ||align=left| Barnabas Szücs || It's Showtime 2009 Budapest || Budapest, Hungary || Ext.R TKO (Ref. stop/gave up) || 4 || 0:46
|-  bgcolor="#FFBBBB"
| 2009-07-13 || Loss ||align=left| Yuya Yamamoto || K-1 World MAX 2009 Final 8 || Tokyo, Japan || Decision (Unanimous) || 3 || 3:00
|-
! style=background:white colspan=9 |
|-
|-  bgcolor="#CCFFCC"
| 2009-05-16 || Win ||align=left| William Diender || It's Showtime 2009 Amsterdam || Amsterdam, Netherlands || TKO (Doc. stop/cut) || 3 ||
|-  bgcolor="#CCFFCC"
| 2009-04-21 || Win ||align=left| Yoshihiro Sato || K-1 World MAX 2009 Final 16 || Fukuoka, Japan || Ext. R. Decision (Unanimous) || 4 || 3:00
|-
! style=background:white colspan=9 |
|-
|-  bgcolor="#FFBBBB"
| 2009-02-08 || Loss ||align=left| Murat Direkçi || Fights at the Border presents: It's Showtime 2009 || Antwerp, Belgium || TKO (Referee stoppage) || 1 || 2:23
|-
! style=background:white colspan=9 |
|-
|-  bgcolor="#FFBBBB"
| 2008-11-29 || Loss ||align=left| Chahid Oulad El Hadj || It's Showtime 2008 Eindhoven || Eindhoven, Netherlands || Decision || 3 || 3:00
|-  bgcolor="#CCFFCC"
| 2008-09-06 || Win ||align=left| James Martinez || It's Showtime 2008 Alkmaar || Alkmaar, Netherlands || KO (Right high kick) || 1 || 2:03
|-  bgcolor="#FFBBBB"
| 2008-07-07 || Loss ||align=left| Masato || K-1 World MAX 2008 Final 8 || Tokyo, Japan || Decision (Unanimous) || 3 || 3:00
|-
! style=background:white colspan=9 |
|-
|-  bgcolor="#FFBBBB"
| 2008-05-31 || Loss ||align=left| William Diender || Beast of the East || Zutphen, Netherlands || KO (Right hook) || 2 || 1:26
|-  bgcolor="#CCFFCC"
| 2008-04-26 || Win ||align=left| Warren Stevelmans || K-1 World GP 2008 in Amsterdam || Amsterdam, Netherlands || Decision (Majority) || 3 || 3:00
|-  bgcolor="#CCFFCC"
| 2008-04-09 || Win ||align=left| Gori || K-1 World MAX 2008 Final 16 || Hiroshima, Japan || KO (Left hook) || 3 || 2:56
|-
! style=background:white colspan=9 |
|-
|-  bgcolor="#c5d2ea"
| 2008-03-15 || Draw ||align=left| Chahid Oulad El Hadj || It's Showtime 75MAX Trophy 2008, Super Fight || 's-Hertogenbosch, Netherlands || Decision draw || 5 || 3:00
|-  bgcolor="#CCFFCC"
| 2008-01-29 || Win ||align=left| Luis Reis || Kickboxing Champions League || Lisboa, Portugal || Decision (Split) || 3 || 3:00
|-  bgcolor="#CCFFCC"
| 2007-11-30 || Win ||align=left| Arnaldo Silva || Kickboxing Cup 2007 || Lisboa, Portugal || Decision (Unanimous) || 3 || 3:00
|-  bgcolor="#FFBBBB"
| 2007-10-03 || Loss ||align=left| Andy Souwer || K-1 World MAX 2007 Final, Quarter Finals || Tokyo, Japan || KO (Right hook) || 2 || 1:43
|-  bgcolor="#FFBBBB"
| 2007-06-28 || Loss ||align=left| Mike Zambidis || K-1 World MAX 2007 World Tournament Final Elimination || Tokyo, Japan || Ext. R Decision (Unanimous) || 4 || 3:00
|-
! style=background:white colspan=9 |
|-
|-  bgcolor="#CCFFCC"
| 2007-06-02 || Win ||align=left| Ait Naceur || Gentleman Gala || Tilburg, Netherlands || TKO (Corner stoppage) || 3 || 1:05
|-  bgcolor="#CCFFCC"
| 2007-04-04 || Win ||align=left| Yutaro Yamauchi || K-1 World MAX 2007 World Elite Showcase || Yokohama, Japan || TKO (Corner stoppage) || 3 || 1:50
|-  bgcolor="#CCFFCC"
| 2007-02-25 || Win ||align=left| Rick Barnhill || It's Showtime Trophy 2007 - Manchester, Super Fight || Altrincham, UK || KO (Knee strike) || 3 || 1:26
|-  bgcolor="#CCFFCC"
| 2007-02-04 || Win ||align=left| Ray Staring || It's Showtime Trophy 2007 - Zwolle, Super Fight || Zwolle, Netherlands || KO (Left high kick) || 4 || 1:34
|-  bgcolor="#CCFFCC"
| 2006-12-03 || Win ||align=left| Bejan Ahmedi || It's Showtime 2006 Alkmaar || Alkmaar, Netherlands || KO (Punches) || 1 ||
|-  bgcolor="#CCFFCC"
| 2006-09-23 || Win ||align=left| Kamal Chabrani || It's Showtime 75MAX Trophy Final 2006, Super Fight || Rotterdam, Netherlands || TKO (Ref Stoppage, 3 Knockdowns) || 1 || 2:58
|-  bgcolor="#CCFFCC"
| 2006-09-04 || Win ||align=left| Naoki Samukawa || K-1 World MAX 2006 Champions' Challenge || Tokyo, Japan || Decision (Unanimous) || 3 || 3:00
|-  bgcolor="#FFBBBB"
| 2006-06-30 || Loss ||align=left| Buakaw Por. Pramuk || K-1 World MAX 2006 Final, Semi Finals || Yokohama, Japan || Decision (Unanimous) || 3 || 3:00
|-  bgcolor="#CCFFCC"
| 2006-06-30 || Win ||align=left| Albert Kraus || K-1 World MAX 2006 Final, Quarter Finals || Yokohama, Japan || Decision (Unanimous) || 3 || 3:00
|-  bgcolor="#FFBBBB"
| 2006-05-13 || Loss ||align=left| Ray Staring || K-1 World Grand Prix 2006 in Amsterdam || Amsterdam, Netherlands || Decision (Unanimous) || 3 || 3:00
|-  bgcolor="#CCFFCC"
| 2006-04-05 || Win ||align=left| Ole Laursen || K-1 World MAX 2006 World Tournament Open || Tokyo, Japan || Decision (Unanimous) || 3 || 3:00
|-
! style=background:white colspan=9 |
|-
|-  bgcolor="#FFBBBB"
| 2006-02-04 || Loss ||align=left| Faldir Chahbari || WFCA Gala || Roosendaal, Netherlands || Decision (Unanimous) || 5 || 3:00
|-  bgcolor="#CCFFCC"
| 2005-12-18 || Win ||align=left| Pasi Luukkanen || It's Showtime 75MAX Trophy Prague, Super Fight || Prague, Czech Republic || KO (Punches) || 2 || 1:20
|-  bgcolor="#CCFFCC"
| 2005-12-10 || Win ||align=left| Jan de Keyzer || Fights at The Border 4 || Lommel, Belgium || KO (Left high kick) || 2 ||
|-  bgcolor="#CCFFCC"
| 2005-10-30 || Win ||align=left| Franklin Semeral || It's Showtime 75MAX Trophy Alkmaar, Super Fight || Alkmaar, Netherlands || KO (Right uppercut) || 1 ||
|-  bgcolor="#CCFFCC"
| 2005-10-02 || Win ||align=left| Jerry Morris || It's Showtime 75MAX Trophy Tilburg, Super Fight || Tilburg, Netherlands || Decision (Unanimous) || 5 || 3:00
|-  bgcolor="#CCFFCC"
| 2005-06-12 || Win ||align=left| Murat Direkçi || It's Showtime 2005 Amsterdam || Amsterdam, Netherlands || Decision (Unanimous) || 5 || 3:00
|-  bgcolor="#CCFFCC"
| 2005-04-23 || Win ||align=left| Abdoul Toure || Gala in Maldegem || Maldegem, Belgium || KO || 1 ||
|-  bgcolor="#CCFFCC"
| 2005-03-19 || Win ||align=left| Ali Gunyar || Gentleman's Promotion Gala || Tilburg, Netherlands || TKO (Doctor stoppage) || 2 ||
|-  bgcolor="#CCFFCC"
| 2005-02-19 || Win ||align=left| Jan van Denderen || Test of Talents Gala || Mortsel, Belgium || Decision (Unanimous) || 5 || 3:00
|-  bgcolor="#CCFFCC"
| 2004-11-27 || Win ||align=left| Yassin Periquet || Test of Talents Gala "Battle at The Coast" || Mortsel, Belgium || TKO (Doctor stoppage) || ||
|-  bgcolor="#CCFFCC"
| 2004-10-10 || Win ||align=left| Amir Zeyada || 2 Hot 2 Handle || Rotterdam, Netherlands || Decision (Unanimous) || 5 || 3:00
|-  bgcolor="#CCFFCC"
| 2004-05-20 || Win ||align=left| Stjepan Veselic || It's Showtime 2004 Amsterdam || Netherlands || Decision (Unanimous) || 5 || 3:00
|-  bgcolor="#CCFFCC"
| 2004-03-20 || Win ||align=left| Konorat || WPKL Muay Thai Champions League XII || Rotterdam, Netherlands || KO || ||
|-  bgcolor="#CCFFCC"
| 2004-02-21 || Win ||align=left| Marijn Geuens || Test of Talent Reloaded III || Mortsel, Belgium || KO (Liver punch) || 3 ||
|-
! style=background:white colspan=9 |
|-
|-  bgcolor="#CCFFCC"
| 2004-01-25 || Win ||align=left| Ali Gunyar || Thaiboxing & Freefight event in Alkmaar || Alkmaar, Netherlands || TKO || 2 ||
|-  bgcolor="#CCFFCC"
| 2004-01-21 || Win ||align=left| Marijn Geuens || Fights at The Border III || Lommel, Belgium || KO || 3 ||
|-
! style=background:white colspan=9 |
|-
|-  bgcolor="#c5d2ea"
| 2003-11-30 || Draw ||align=left| Alviar Lima || Killerdome IV || Amsterdam, Netherlands || Decision draw || 5 || 3:00
|-  bgcolor="#CCFFCC"
| 2003-09-28 || Win ||align=left| Mohamed Ouali || WPKL Muay Thai Champions League XI || Rotterdam, Netherlands || TKO (Doctor stoppage) || 4 ||
|-  bgcolor="#CCFFCC"
| 2003-06-14 || Win ||align=left| Rene Müller || K-1 Germany 2003 || Bergheim, Germany || KO (Knee strike) || 1 ||
|-  bgcolor="#CCFFCC"
| 2003-06-08 || Win ||align=left| Imro Main || It's Showtime 2003 Amsterdam || Amsterdam, Netherlands || Decision (Unanimous) || 5 || 3:00
|-  bgcolor="#CCFFCC"
| 2003-04-06 || Win ||align=left| Stjepan Veselic || K-1 World Grand Prix 2003 Preliminary Holland || Netherlands || KO (Right knee strike) || 3 || 2:40
|-  bgcolor="#CCFFCC"
| 2003-02-15 || Win ||align=left| Nadier Larecht || Xena Sport Victory Or Hell 8 || Amsterdam, Netherlands || KO  || 2 ||
|-  bgcolor="#CCFFCC"
| 2002-11-30 || Win ||align=left| Rafi Zouheir || WPKL Muay Thai Champions League VIII || Rotterdam, Netherlands || TKO (Corner stoppage) || 4 || 1:03
|-  bgcolor="#CCFFCC"
| 2002-11-24 || Win ||align=left| Murat Kumas || Xena Sport Victory Or Hell || Netherlands || KO (High kick) || 1 ||
|-  bgcolor="#FFBBBB"
| 2002-10-27 || Loss ||align=left| William Diender || Beast of The East || Arnhem, Netherlands || Decision (Unanimous) || 5 || 3:00
|-  bgcolor="#CCFFCC"
| 2002-09-29 || Win ||align=left| Chris van Venrooij || It's Showtime – As Usual / Battle Time || Haarlem, Netherlands || TKO (Corner stoppage) || 4 || 1:28
|-  bgcolor="#CCFFCC"
| 2002-07-07 || Win ||align=left| Marco Pique || Bad Boys Day part. 1 || Utrecht, Netherlands || KO (Right high kick) || 4 ||
|-  bgcolor="#CCFFCC"
| 2002-05-25 || Win ||align=left| Ludo Lasseu || Thaiboxing Gala || Deurne, Belgium || TKO (Corner stoppage) || 2 ||
|-
! style=background:white colspan=9 |
|-
|-  bgcolor="#CCFFCC"
| 2002-04-21 || Win ||align=left| Marco Pique || Xena Sport Victory Or Hell 7 || Netherlands || Decision (Unanimous) || 5 || 3:00
|-  bgcolor="#CCFFCC"
| 2002-01-26 || Win ||align=left| Chris van Venrooij || Gym Alkmaar Fight Gala || Alkmaar, Netherlands || Decision (Unanimous) || 5 || 3:00
|-  bgcolor="#CCFFCC"
| 2001-12-02 || Win ||align=left| Youssef Akhnikh || MTBN Fight Gala in Sporthal Holten || Marum, Netherlands || TKO || ||
|-
| colspan=9 | Legend:

See also
 List of K-1 events
 List of K-1 champions
 List of It's Showtime events
 List of male kickboxers

References

External links
 Gago Drago's Official Homepage
 Gym Alkmaar
 It's Showtime 
 Gago Drago profile at ArmenianClub
 Gago_Drago profile & fights at Rusmma.at.ua

1985 births
Living people
Armenian male kickboxers
Dutch male kickboxers
Welterweight kickboxers
Armenian Muay Thai practitioners
Dutch Muay Thai practitioners
Dutch people of Armenian descent
Armenian emigrants to the Netherlands
Sportspeople from Alkmaar